Francisco Peralta y Ballabriga (15 August 1911 – 23 August 2006) was a Spanish Roman Catholic bishop. At the time of his death, aged 95, he was one of the oldest bishops in the Church and one of the oldest bishops in Spain.

Biography 

Lafuente was born in Híjar in 1911 and was ordained a priest on 28 March 1936. He had his first pastoral chargement as parson of Jatiel, Castelnou and La Puebla de Híjar. He was also professor at the seminar and at the University of Zaragoza.

Appointed Bishop of Vitoria on 9 January 1955, he was consecrated on the following March 20 by Archbishop Ildebrando Antoniutti, apostolic nuncio in Spain.

He participated in all four sessions of the Second Vatican Council and promoted in his diocese the liturgical reforms by the council.

He resigned on 10 July 1978 and died on 23 August 2006, eight days after his was ninety-fifth birthday.

Bibliography 
 Mariano Laborda, Recuerdos de Híjar, Centro de Iniciativas Turísticas del Cuadro Artístito de Híjar, 1980.
 Mariano Laborda, Recuerdos de Híjar 2, Centro de Iniciativas Turísticas del Cuadro Artístito de Híjar, 1993.

References

External links 
 Catholic Hierarchy 
 Official website of the Diocese of Vitoria 
Francisco Peralta y Ballabriga's obituary 

1911 births
2006 deaths
People from the Province of Teruel
20th-century Roman Catholic bishops in Spain